All in 700 is a 2016 Taiwanese television series starring Darren Chiu, Jessie Chang, Ikeya Chen, Lung Shao-hua, Jason King and Ting Chiang. Filming began on June 24, 2015 and wrapped up on June 8, 2016. First original broadcast began on November 23, 2016 on TTV airing every weekdays night at 8:00-9:00 pm.

Synopsis
A group of elderly citizens has been nearly forgotten by the bustling modern Taiwanese society. But the baby boomer residents at the Yinhwa senior community know all about living through tough times to help usher in the Taiwanese economic boom. But when their own safe haven of Yinhwa comes under fiscal hardship, they need to act fast. With the help of young photographer Li Rong An (Darren Qiu) and Liu Yu Fan (Ikeya Chen), the senior citizens embark on a tour of Taiwan to draw attention to their cause through modern social media. Can 10 senior citizens, whose combined age is more than 700 years, prove that they are still relevant to modern society?

Cast

Main cast

 as Li Rong An 李榕桉
 as Li Xin Yue 黎心悅
 as Liu Yu Fan (Fan Fan) 劉玉帆（帆帆）
 as Wang Shang Ji 王上吉（Jimmy）
Ting Chiang as Zhang Hu Sheng (Uncle Lan Shan)  張滬生（藍山伯）
 as young Uncle Lan Shan
 as Li Tian Yong (Uncle Yong) 李天勇（勇伯）
 as Liu Hao 劉好
 as young Liu Hao
 as Gu Mei Jun 顧梅君
 as Grandma Gu (Da Ah Ma) 顧奶奶（大阿嬤）
Sara Yu 琇琴 as young Grandma Gu
Tang Chuan 唐川 as Xu Chao Huang 許朝晃
Tsao Ching-chun 曹景俊 as young Chao Huang
Lin Nai-hua 林乃華 as Liao Shu Qin 廖淑卿
 as Chen Bi Xian 陳必先
 as young Bi Xian
Shangguan Min 上官鳴 as Wu Huo Wang 吳火旺
 as Yang Qiao Fang 楊巧芳
 as Lao Xiao Shan 勞小珊（Laura）

Supporting cast
Lung Shao-hua 龍劭華 as Li De Lang 黎德朗
Joe Shu-Wei Chang 張書偉 as young De Lang
Wen Yi Ru 潘奕如 as Huang Kai Lin 黃愷琳
Aron 龍三 as Zhu Yun Hao 朱允豪
Ti Chih-Chieh 狄志杰 as Du Xue Ya 杜學亞

Special guest appearance

Zheng Cheng Jun 程政鈞 as Shi Guang's father
Wu Jun Yi 吳俊毅 as coast guard
Fu Xian Hao 傅顯皓
Zheng Yu Han 鄭羽涵
Wu Ling Shan 吳鈴山 as Chen Zhen Xin 陳振欣
Debbie Chou 周丹薇 as Zhuang Jin Hong 莊錦紅
Wu Guo Zhou 吳國州 as Xiao Liu 小劉
Huang Hao You 黃浩詠 as Scrievener Jian 簡代書
Francesca Kao as Tan Li Zhen 
Angus Hsieh 謝承均 as Zhou Shi Guang 周世光
Liu Xiang Jun 劉香君 as fortuneteller
Ronan Lo 羅能華 as Xiao Tang 小唐
Candy Yang 楊小黎 as Li Min 麗敏
Annie Duan 段可風 as Ai Mei 艾眉
Ting Chen 陳霆 as young Grandpa Gu 年輕顧爺爺 
Zhang Dong Qing 張東晴 as Sha Wei Ka 莎薇卡
Da Pai 大牌 as mayor
Hsu Nai-lin as visitor
Lee Chih-Ching 李之勤 as Cheng Xi 程曦
Jiang Qing Xia 江青霞 as Lai Shu Mei 賴淑美
Ouyang Lun 歐陽倫 as Chen Jie Sheng 陳傑生
Ruan Yu Tian 阮于恬 as author
Lin Yi Xiong 林義雄 as Liu Zhong Qiang 劉忠強
Ding Ning 丁寧 as Sha Man Sha 莎曼莎
Huang Shu Wei 黃書維 as An Chen 安臣
Emily Liang 梁佑南 as Chen Yue Xia 陳月霞
Chung Hsin-Ling 鍾欣凌 as Wan Ping 婉萍
Lan Ya Yun 藍雅芸 as designer
Zheng Kai Yun 鄭凱云 as Gu Jin Cheng 顧晉承
Fang Da Wei 方大韋 as Chen Wen Rui 陳文瑞
Lu Biao 盧彪 as Zheng Kun Qiang 鄭坤強
Zhang Ling Ling 張翎翎 as Jiang Xiao Hui 江曉慧
Pai Ming-Hua 白明華 as Shu Qin's mother
Wei-Hua Lan 藍葦華 as Zhu Zhi Ming 朱志銘
Jimmy Tseng 曾子益 as Wang Da Wei 王大偉
Chen Yu-Mei 陳玉玫 as Zhang Xiu Qin 張秀琴
Cai Yi Jun 蔡宜君 as Guo Ming Mei 郭明美
Jian Chang 檢場 as Chen Zheng Rong 陳正榮
Yin Chao-te 尹昭德 as Chen Li Ye 陳立業
Jane Hsu 許蓁蓁 as Ai Lin 艾琳
Joseph Hsia 夏靖庭 as Gao Ming Cheng 高明誠

Soundtrack

Love With No Regrets 愛無遺憾 by Ric Jan 荒山亮
How Have You Been 別來無恙 by Christine Fan 范瑋琪 feat. William Wei 韋禮安
Some Time After 很久很久以後 by Christine Fan 范瑋琪
Seesaw 翹翹板 by Fang Wu 吳汶芳
 散落的星空 by Fang Wu 吳汶芳
A Youth 一首青春 by Lin Zong Xing 林宗興
 日頭的味 by Cai Jia Ying 蔡佳瑩
That Person 彼個人 by Joey Chiang 江惠儀
 無想欲離開 by Joey Chiang 江惠儀
Slowly Love 緩緩愛 by Joey Chiang 江惠儀
 思念來敲門 by Joey Chiang 江惠儀
 幸福會慣習 by Joey Chiang 江惠儀
 再會青春的夢 by Joey Chiang 江惠儀
 藍色紀念日 by Queenie Fang 方宥心
 我會乖乖 by Cai Cheng-Rong 蔡承融
Ship of Happiness 幸福的船 by Jenny Huang 黃鳳儀
 放輕鬆 by Jenny Huang 黃鳳儀
Whisky Love Song Whisky情歌 by Jenny Huang 黃鳳儀
Your Companion 你作伴 by Jenny Huang 黃鳳儀
I'll Live For You 為你活下去 by Ric Jan 荒山亮
Sound of A Broken Heart 心破碎的聲 by Ric Jan 荒山亮
My Favorite Love Song 最愛的情歌 by Ric Jan 荒山亮

Broadcast

Episode ratings
Competing dramas on rival channels airing at the same time slot were:
SET Taiwan - Taste of Life
SET Metro - V-Focus
CTV - The Age of Innocence, Let It Fly
FTV - Spring Flower
CTS - W

: No episode was aired on January 27, 2017 due to TTV airing of "2017 Super Star: A Red & White Lunar New Year Special"

References

External links
All in 700 TTV Website  
 

2016 Taiwanese television series debuts
2017 Taiwanese television series endings
Taiwan Television original programming
Hokkien-language television shows